Willy McIntosh (born April 4, 1970) is a Thai actor and television presenter. He also produces TV show and Thai films such as Saranae Show, Saranae Siblor and Saranae hen phi.

Early life and education 
McIntosh was born to a Scottish father and a Thai Chinese mother. His sister is also a well-known Thai actress, Kathaleeya McIntosh. He graduated from the Prince Royal's College in Chiang Mai and received a bachelor's degree from Eastern Michigan University.

Personal life 
In 1995, McIntosh began dating fashion model Geraldine Ricondell. They were married in 2006, at the Holy Rosary Church. Ricondell gave birth to their son on 19 August 2014 in Bangkok.

Filmography 
(1989) Tanya: Maemod Yod Yoong
(1990) Num Sao
(1991) Mangkon Chao Phaya 2
(1995) Mahasajan Hang Rak
(2009) Saranae Hao Peng
(2010) Saranae Siblor
(2010) Saranae hen phi
(2012) Saranae O sei kai
(2017) Saranae Love You

Television

TV Series 

 Reun Ram (1993) (Channel 7)
 Muean Khon La Fark Fah (1994) (Channel 3)
 Prasard Mued (1994) (Channel 3)
 Nimit Hang Ruk (1995) (Channel 3)
 Fai Tang See (1995) (Channel 3)
 Sai See Pleung (1996) (Channel 3)
 Ruk Diow Kong Jenjira (1996) (Channel 3)
 Tam Hua Jai Pai Sood Lah (1997) (Channel 3)
 Fai Luang (1998) (1998) (Channel 3)
 Pao Pla Lai (1998) (Channel 3)
 Jarkfun Sunirandon (1998) (Channel 3)
 Ruk Lae Patubai (1999) (Channel 3)
 Manee Yard Fah (2000) (Channel 3)
 Kak Petch (2001) (Channel 3)
 Viwa Salub (2002) (Channel 3)
 Nangrai (2001) (Channel 3)
 5 Kom (2002) (Channel 3)
 Kor Plik Fah Tarm Lah Tur (2003) (Channel 3)
 Jay Dun Chun Ruk Tur (2005) (Channel 3)
 2 Pu Ying Yai (2005) (Channel 3)
 Sapai Ka Fak (2005) (Channel 3)
 Soo Fun Nirundorn (2008) (Channel 3)
 Sut Saneha (2009) (Channel 3)
 Club Friday The Series 5 (2015) (GMM25)
 Seu Rissaya (2015) (ONEHD)
 Poo Ying Kon Nun Chue Boonrawd (2015) (ONEHD)
 Krungthep Mahanakorn Sorn Ruk (2016) (ONEHD)
 Plerng Kritsana The Series (2017) (GMM25)
 Cheewit Puer Kah Huajai Puer Tur (2017) (ONEHD)
 Club Friday Celeb's Stories (2017) (GMM25)
 Paragit Ruk Series (2017) (Channel 7)
 The Single Mom (2017) (Channel 3)
 Sampat Ruttikan (2018) (GMM25)
 Duang Jai Nai Fai Nhao (2018) (Channel 3)

TV Program 

 Salanae Show
 Bang Cha Kreng
 Ha Cha Kreng
 Rat Chat News
 Nang Yarng Show
 Seub Sadet

 Game Zone
 Fantasy Mee Hang
 Samakom Chomdao: The Willy
 I See U
 Miss Universe Thailand 2014
 Celebrity Game Night Thailand

Endorsements 

 Suan Siam Park (1986)
 Nivea (1989)
 Rejoice Shampoo (1992)
 Clorets (1995-2001) 
 Lipton Tea (1995)

 Clairol Shampoo (1996)
 Honda City (1996)
 Bigen Cream Color (2001)
 Tawan Snack (2006-2011)
 Omo Plus (2007-2012)

References

External links 

 

1974 births
Living people
Willy McIntosh
Willy McIntosh
Willy McIntosh
Willy McIntosh
Willy McIntosh
Willy McIntosh
Willy McIntosh
Willy McIntosh
Willy McIntosh
Thai television personalities
Willy McIntosh
Willy McIntosh